Cole Henley is a hamlet in the Basingstoke and Deane district of Hampshire, England.

Governance
The hamlet is part of the civil parish and ward of Whitchurch, part of Basingstoke and Deane borough council. The borough council is a Non-metropolitan district of Hampshire County Council.

References

External links

Villages in Hampshire